The Raleigh Hotel in the South Beach section of Miami Beach, Florida is an art deco building designed by L. Murray Dixon. It is located at 1775 Collins Avenue. The hotel was closed in 2017 after damage from Hurricane Irma. In 2019 it was purchased by a group of developers including SHVO and Deutsche Finance America. In March 2022, it was announced that the hotel would be restored and operated by Rosewood Hotels, reopening in 2025 as Rosewood The Raleigh Miami Beach.

History

Raleigh Hotel was designed by Lawrence Murray Dixon and opened in 1940. Original construction cost for the property was $225,000.  The first ownership change for the hotel came in 1941 when Max Marmerstein purchased a half interest in the amount of $90,000. In 1946, the hotel was purchased for $1 million by a group of investors from Boston, Massachusetts.

In 1979, the hotel became listed on the National Register of Historic Places as a contributing building in the Miami Beach Architectural District.

The hotel was purchased by the Brilla Group in 2009 for $30 million. It was sold again in 2012 to David Edelstein and Sam Nazarian for $55 million. It was the purchased by Hilfiger Hospitality in $56.5 million in 2014. In 2015, Hilfiger was approved by the Miami Beach Historic Preservation Board to renovate the hotel. The hotel was closed in 2017 after damage from Hurricane Irma prior to completion of the proposed renovations.

The hotel was again sold in 2019 for $103 million. This time, it was purchased by a partnership of developers which included SHVO and Deutsche Finance America. In March 2022, it was announced that the hotel would be restored and operated by Rosewood Hotels, reopening in 2025 as Rosewood The Raleigh Miami Beach.

Design
 
The original design of the hotel included 113 rooms. The entrances were decorated with polished stone and the lobby illuminated with recessed neon. The hotel included a lounge, known as the Raleigh room, as well as a dining room, cocktail lounge, barbershop, beauty parlor, and eight penthouses.

The Raleigh Hotel has an "iconic pool" which was used in several movies. It was featured on the cover of Life in the 1940s and featured in films that include The Birdcage, Bad Boys, and Up Close and Personal.

References

External links
 Rosewood The Raleigh Miami Beach official website

Hotels in Miami Beach, Florida
Hotels established in 1940
Hotel buildings completed in 1940
Art Deco hotels
Art Deco architecture in Florida
Miami Beach Architectural District